Digital Cinema Media (DCM) is an advertising company, supplying cinema advertisements to Cineworld, Odeon, and Vue cinema chains. The company was formed in July 2008 and is owned by Cineworld and Odeon equally.

Formation 
Prior to its formation, Digital Cinema Media was known as Rank Screen Advertising, a firm owned by The Rank Organisation, and Carlton Screen Advertising, the latter formed in 1996 after Carlton Communications purchased Rank Screen Advertising from The Rank Group. The new company supplied cinema advertising for Odeon and Cineworld, as well as ABC and UCI Cinemas, prior to their respective takeovers by Odeon. In 1999, cinema operator UGC joined the business following its buyout of Virgin Cinemas. However, its UK business was taken over by Cineworld in 2004.

In July 2008, Cineworld Group and Odeon Cinemas rebranded Carlton Screen Advertising as Digital Cinema Media, acquiring the company in a 50-50 venture; Carlton Screen Advertising's operations in Ireland were spun off and in 2014 would become Wide Eye Media (which is as of 2022 currently the Irish branch of Pearl & Dean). It supplied idents for the UK sites of Cineworld and Odeon; the new look and identity first came into force on October 1, 2008. A deal signed in 2010 saw all Vue Cinemas sites included in the business from 1 January 2011; this has resulted in the company supplying advertisements for nearly 90% of UK cinemas. In April 2011, DCM changed their on-screen identity for the second time. In September 2012, DCM became the first UK cinema advertising company to 'go digital', though some older cinema sites, mostly those operated by Vue, continue to use standard film.

In January 2013, DCM changed their idents and company logo, and also introduced a brand new strapline - 'Dynamic Advertising'. The old idents were still in use until early March 2013. In January 2014, DCM hosted a College Project in which students have to design a new ident for DCM. In December 2016, DCM was awarded a contract with Everyman Cinemas, becoming the chain's commercial partner.

On 7 September 2022, Cineworld filed for Chapter 11 bankruptcy in the United States.

Digital advertising 
Beginning in 2009, when 3D films began to take a dominating force in the film market, DCM introduced reels produced in 'digital film', which were only used to precede films in 3D at the time. This eliminated such implications as 'cue dots' and graining that had become familiar on standard film. The 'fade to black' function after each advert was also removed, and thus the reel started the next advert immediately after the previous. Upon the original change of image in April 2011, all reels were produced in digital format for all films at cinemas that were capable of showing them. DCM stopped using standard film in September 2012, and is currently in the process of converting every cinema site that it supplies advertising, to digital.

Following the current trend of the latest films becoming available in digital 3D, DCM announced plans to go down that route with advertising. In December 2009,  Avatar was the first film in Britain to be coupled with a 3D advertising reel.

Controversy 
In 2015, DCM created controversy when they did not permit the display of a Church of England advert featuring the Lord's Prayer, due to their policies prohibiting religious advertising. The government's equalities watchdog also voiced alarm, suggesting it undermined "essential British values". However, the BBFC had no problem with it and passed it with a U rating.

Identification history 
DCM have used three different idents. Usually, a 10-second version of the ident is seen as usually the first clip seen at the start of the cinema reel. A 15-second version is later seen before the trailers begin, around 10 minutes into the cinema reel.

The first ones, which debuted in UK cinemas on 1 October 2008, showed a montage of film images with a cinemagoer, accompanied by electronic music. These idents were in use until 3 April 2011, when they were replaced again. By 2011, the previous idents were replaced with an 'illuminated glass' version of the DCM logo and new music, produced by Jump Design. These idents were used until March 2013.

In 2013, the "Dynamic Advertising" idents by Fearlessly Frank were introduced. The tagline was short-lived, however, and was changed to "Welcome To Our World" in October 2013. These idents were uploaded to YouTube on January 23, 2013, and was officially adapted two days later, though some cinemas did not adapt it until a few months later. Laughter and Suspense were dropped in January 2014, but made a comeback in some cinemas in December 2014, though it did not make a return to all cinemas until 2017. Originally, at the end of the idents, the company's then-slogan,"Dynamic advertising" was seen at the end, but now the slogan "Welcome To Our World" is seen since 2014. Generally, Amazement is used before most films, with Laughter being used before a comedy film and Suspense before a horror or action movie.

See also
 Carlton Screen Advertising
 Cineworld
 Odeon Cinemas
 Vue Cinemas

References

External links 

Advertising agencies of the United Kingdom
Companies that filed for Chapter 11 bankruptcy in 2022